"Just a Baby Boy" is a song by American rapper Snoop Dogg featuring guest vocals from American R&B singer and actor Tyrese and rapper Mr. Tan, taken from the soundtrack Baby Boy. The song was written by Snoop Dogg, Tyrese and Kevin "DJ Battlecat" Gilliam, who also handled production. The song was also included in the second Tyrese studio album, 2000 Watts.

Music video 
The video has the appearance of Snoop Dogg, Tyrese and Mr. Tan. The video uses scenes from the film Baby Boy.

Track listing
CD single
"Just a Baby Boy" (Radio Edit) (with Tyrese featuring Mr. Tan) — 4:00
"Just a Baby Boy" (Instrumental) — 4:16
"Just a Baby Boy" (Call-Out Hook) (with Tyrese featuring Mr. Tan) — 0:24
"Just a Baby Boy" (Hip-Hop Mix) (Radio Edit) (with Tyrese featuring Mr. Tan) — 4:00

Charts

References

2001 singles
Snoop Dogg songs
Tyrese Gibson songs
2001 songs
Universal Records singles
Songs written by Tyrese Gibson
Songs written by Snoop Dogg
Songs written by Battlecat (record producer)
Song recordings produced by Battlecat (record producer)